Events from the year 2017 in Taiwan, Republic of China. This year is numbered Minguo 106 according to the official Republic of China calendar.

Incumbents
 President – Tsai Ing-wen
 Vice President – Chen Chien-jen
 Premier – Lin Chuan, William Lai
 Vice Premier – Lin Hsi-yao, Shih Jun-ji

Events

January
 1 January
 The abolishment of the Special Investigation Division.
 The increment of monthly minimum wage from NT$20,008 to NT$21,009 and hourly minimum wage from NT$126 to NT$133.
 The reduction of annual national holidays from 19 to 12 days.
 The increment of annual leaves from 0 to 3 days, 7 to 10 days, 10 to 14 days and 14 to 15 days for employees who have worked for 6–12 months, 2–3 years, 3–5 years and 5–10 years respectively.
 Implementation of smoking ban at all bus stops in Taipei.
 5 January – The opening of Taiwan High Speed Rail Museum in Taoyuan City.
 6 January – American-born Roman Catholic priest Brendan O'Connell becomes the first foreign-born, naturalized citizen of the Republic of China.
 7 January – Resignation of Kuomintang Deputy Chairperson Steve Chan.
 11 January – Liaoning aircraft carrier sailed along the western side of Taiwan Strait median line.
 17 January – The establishment of Kinmen-Matsu Joint Services Center in Kinmen.

February
 2 February – Taoyuan International Airport MRT of Taoyuan Metro began trial runs.
 8 February – The swearing-in of:
 Chen Shih-chung as the Minister of Health and Welfare
 Chen Liang-gee as the Minister of Science and Technology
 Lin Mei-chu as the Minister of Labor
 Lin Tsung-hsien as the Minister of Council of Agriculture
 13 February – Tour bus accident in Nangang District, Taipei killing 33 passengers.

March
 2 March
 The official launch of Taoyuan Airport MRT.
 The opening of Linkou Station in Linkou District, New Taipei.
 The opening of Taishan Station in Taishan District, New Taipei.
 The opening of Xinzhuang Fuduxin Station in Xinzhuang District, New Taipei.
 10 March –  The opening of Presidential branch office in Kaohsiung.
 12 March – The founding of the People Rich Party by Chang Mu-ting.
 15–19 March – 2017 World Junior Figure Skating Championships
 16 March – The establishment of the Anti-Money Laundering Office.
 18 March – The opening of Presidential branch office in Taichung.

April
 21 April – The launch of Taiwan Halal Center at Taipei World Trade Center.

May
 10 May – The closure of Fiji Trade and Tourism Representative Office in Taipei.
 13 May – The opening of Sky Dream, Taiwan's largest Ferries wheel in Houli District, Taichung.
 15 May – The final print edition of The China Post is published.
 20 May – 2017 Kuomintang chairmanship election
 24 May – The Judicial Yuan ruled that laws restricting same-sex marriage were unconstitutional and gave the Legislative Yuan two years to amend existing laws or create new laws so as to comply with the court's decision.

June
 6 June – Visit of Palau Health Minister Emais Roberts to Taipei.
 13 June – Panama switches diplomatic relations from the Republic of China to the People's Republic of China.

July
 1 July – People's Liberation Army (PLA) Liaoning aircraft carrier entered the air defense identification zone (ADIZ) of Taiwan.
 20 July – Eight PLA Xian H-6K bomber aircraft and one Shaanxi Y-8 aircraft flew near east and west coasts of Taiwan.
 25 July – One PLA Xian H-6K bomber aircraft flew near Taiwan ADIZ passing through Bashi Channel and the Miyako Strait.
 29 July – Typhoon Nesat made landfall in Taiwan.

August
 1 August – The upgrade of Chungyu Institute of Technology in Xinyi District, Keelung to be Chungyu University of Film and Arts.
 5 August – A group of PLA Xian H-6K bomber aircraft and one Shaanxi Y-8 aircraft flew near Taiwan ADIZ.
 9 August – One PLA Shaanxi Y-8 aircraft flew east of Taiwan passing through the Miyako Strait.
 13 August – Two PLA Shaanxi Y-8 aircraft flew east of Taiwan.
 15 August
 Tatan Power Company tripped causing blackout to northern half of Taiwan Island.
 Economic Affairs Minister Lee Chih-kung tendered his resignation.
 16 August – Shen Jong-chin appointed acting Minister of Economic Affairs.
 19 August – Opening ceremony of the 2017 Summer Universiade held at Taipei Municipal Stadium.
 30 August – Closing ceremony of the 2017 Summer Universiade held at Taipei Municipal Stadium.

September
 8 September
 The appointment of William Lai as the Premier of the Republic of China.
 The appointment of Shih Jun-ji as the Vice Premier of the Republic of China.
 The appointment of Shen Jong-chin as the Minister of Economic Affairs.
 The appointment of Kung Ming-hsin as the Deputy Minister of Economic Affairs.
 The appointment of Chen Mei-ling as the Minister of National Development Council.
 The appointment of Chiou Jiunn-rong (邱俊榮) as the Deputy Minister of National Development Council.
 The appointment of Wellington Koo as the Chairperson of Financial Supervisory Commission.
 The appointment of Lee Meng-yen as the acting Mayor of Tainan.
 The appointment of Cho Jung-tai as the Secretary-General of Executive Yuan.
 15 September – The disestablishment of Mongolian and Tibetan Affairs Commission.
 26 September – The opening of Circular Line Phase I of Kaohsiung MRT.

October
 2–8 October – 2017 OEC Kaohsiung
 15 October – The opening of Jinlun Bridge in Taimali Township, Taitung County.

November
 10 November – The passage of the Political Party Act by the Legislative Yuan.
 27 November – The opening of Japanese Cultural Center in Songshan District, Taipei.
 28 November – The appointment of Su Li-chiung as the Deputy Minister of Labor, replacing Liau Huei-fang.

December
 5 December – The passage of the Act on Promoting Transitional Justice by the Legislative Yuan.
 23 December – The opening of Baolai Spring Park in Liouguei District, Kaohsiung.

Deaths
 8 January – , 69, Taiwanese politician, Secretary-General of People First Party, heart attack.
 22 January – Chen Yu-mei, 50, Taiwanese politician, deputy minister of the OCAC (2013–14).
 23 January – Leslie Koo, 62, Taiwanese business executive (Taiwan Cement), fall.
 24 January – , 92, Taiwanese aeronautical engineer (AIDC F-CK-1 Ching-kuo).
 9 February – Chen Hsing-ling, 92, Taiwanese military officer.
 16 February – Wang Ben-hu, 63, Taiwanese television presenter, complications of bone marrow and intestinal cancer.
 8 March – Li Yuan-tsu, 93, Taiwanese politician, Vice President of the Republic of China (1990–1996), kidney failure.
 11 March – Tsui Hsiao-ping, 94, Taiwanese radio director.
 26 March – Chen Uen, 58, Taiwanese manhua artist, heart attack.
 8 April – Pei Pu-yen, 96, Taiwanese literary scholar, brain tumor.
 18 April – Li Yih-yuan, 85, Taiwanese anthropologist, complications of pneumonia.
 20 April – Chen Lien-hua (陳蓮花), 93, Taiwanese comfort woman, intestinal infection.
 22 April – Lee Chi-chun, 74, Taiwanese radio presenter.
25 April – Hsieh Chin-ting, 81, Taiwanese politician, Miaoli County Magistrate (1981–1989).
 27 April – Lin Yi-han, 26, Taiwanese writer, suicide by hanging.
 15 May – Chu Ke-liang, 70, Taiwanese actor (The New Legend of Shaolin, David Loman, The Wonderful Wedding) and comedian, liver failure.
 31 May – Jerry Martinson, 74, American-born Taiwanese Jesuit priest, heart attack.
 10 June – Chi Po-lin, 52, Taiwanese film director (Beyond Beauty: Taiwan from Above), helicopter crash.
 18 June – Shih Chun-jen, 93, Taiwanese neurosurgeon, Minister of the Department of Health (1986–1990), heart attack.
21 June – , 52, Taiwanese political commentator, brain tumor.
 Jeffrey Ying (應天華), 63, Taiwanese aviator, first Taiwanese pilot to circumnavigate the globe in a single-engine airplane, plane crash. 
 18 July – , 66, Taiwanese businessman, (Eslite Bookstore).
 22 July – , 83, American-born Taiwanese Jesuit priest.
 31 July – Liu Wen-hsiung, 62, Taiwanese politician, MLY (1999–2008).
22 August – Matthew Kia Yen-wen, 92, Taiwanese Roman Catholic prelate, Archbishop of Taipei (1978–1989), Bishop of Kiayi (1970–1974) and Hwalien (1974–1978).
22 September – , 70, Sarawak-born Taiwanese novelist, multiple organ failure.
27 September – Shen Che-tsai, 91, Taiwanese painter.
28 September – Lee Hsin, 64, Taiwanese politician, member of the National Assembly (1996–1998) and the Taipei City Council (since 1998), suicide by jumping.
4 November – Cheng Ch'ing-wen, 85, Taiwanese writer.
16 November – Hsiao Teng-tzang, 83, Taiwanese politician, MLY (1973–1986), Minister of Justice (1988–1989).
19 November – Tai Chen-yao, 69, Taiwanese politician, MLY (1990–1996, 1999–2002), pancreatic cancer.
9 December – Ching Li, 72, Taiwanese actress.
14 December – Yu Kwang-chung, 89, Taiwanese poet.
 22 December – Wang Panyuan, 109, Taiwanese painter, multiple organ failure.

References

 
Years of the 21st century in Taiwan
Taiwan
Taiwan
2010s in Taiwan